Máscara Divina (Spanish: Divine Mask; born 26 August 1972), is the ring name of a Mexican Luchador enmascarado, or masked professional wrestler. He is best known for appearing in the Asistencia Asesoría y Administración (AAA) promotion.

Mascara Divina has worked under various ring names such as Máscara Sagrada, Super Mascara Sagrada, Televisa Deportes, Triple A, Super AAA, and El Alberije. He is a former co-holder of the AAA Mascot Tag Team Championship along with Mascarita Sagrada 2000 and the Mexican National Tag Team Championship with La Parka Jr. Máscara Divina's real name is not a matter of public record, as is often the case with masked wrestlers in Mexico where their private lives are kept a secret from wrestling fans.

Championships and accomplishments 
Lucha Libre AAA Worldwide
 AAA Mascot Tag Team Championship (1 time) – with Mascarita Sagrada 2000
Mexican National Tag Team Championship (1 time) with La Parka Jr. (1)

References

1972 births
Living people
Masked wrestlers
Mexican male professional wrestlers
Unidentified wrestlers
20th-century professional wrestlers
21st-century professional wrestlers
Mexican National Tag Team Champions